Kevin Armando Sandoval Laynes (born 3 May 1997) is a Peruvian professional footballer who plays as a winger for Peruvian Primera División club Cienciano.

Club career
Sandoval made his professional debut on 11 March 2017 in Ayacucho's 1–0 defeat against Sport Rosario. He scored his first goal on 6 April 2018 in a 2–3 defeat against Comerciantes Unidos.

International career
Sandoval was part of Peru under-23 team which played in 2020 CONMEBOL Pre-Olympic Tournament.

On 28 August 2020, Sandoval was included in senior team's preliminary squad for 2022 FIFA World Cup qualifying matches against Paraguay and Brazil.

References

External links
 

1997 births
Living people
People from Chiclayo
Association football wingers
Peruvian footballers
Peruvian Primera División players
Ayacucho FC footballers
Sporting Cristal footballers
Cienciano footballers